Atapaka is a village in Kaikaluru mandal of Krishna district, Andhra Pradesh, India.

Demographics
According to Indian census, 2001, the demographic details of Atapaka mandal is as follows:
 Total Population:  4,883 in 1,144 Households
 Male Population:  2,453 and Female Population:  2,430
 Children Under 6-years of age: 655 (Boys - and Girls - 331)
 Total Literates:  3,035

Eminent persons
 Banda Kanakalingeshwara Rao, famous Telugu drama and film actor was born here.

References

Villages in Krishna district